Thaumatomyia notata, the yellow swarming fly, is a species of 'fruit flies' or 'grass flies' belonging to the family Chloropidae subfamily Chloropinae.

This species is present in most of Europe, in the Afrotropical realm, in the Near East, in North Africa, and in the Indomalayan realm.

The thorax and the eyes margins are bright yellow, mesonotum shows brown longitudinal bands and yellow stripes, the abdomen is yellow with large horizontal brown stripes.

They start flying in late March or in the first half of April and can be encountered feeding on nectar of flowers and various sweet liquids and excretions. They overwinter hibernating as adults, after at least two generations in a year.

In Europe in some localities from late Summer through December this species shows an aggregation behaviour, forming big swarms appearing as clouds or smoke, that invade buildings and parks.

Larvae usually live in roots of grasses. They are carnivorous, mainly preying on 'root aphids' ('Sugar-beet root aphids' Pemphigus fuscicornis, 'Lettuce root aphids' Pemphigus bursarius, etc.).

References

 Emilia P. Narchuk -  Outbreaks of carnivorous fly Thaumatomyia notata
 Markov, F. I.; Isakulova, D. I. - The beet root aphid and Thaumatomyia - Zashchita Rastenii 1980 No. 8 pp. 18–19
 Kotrba M. - Male flies with yellow balls – New observations on the eversible vesicles on the postabdomen of male Thaumatomyia notata (Diptera: Chloropidae) - Eur. J. Entomol. 2009, 106(1): 57–62

External links
 Biolib
 Fauna Europaea
 Diptera

Chloropinae
Insects described in 1830
Articles containing video clips